Vai que Dá Certo is a 2013 Brazilian crime comedy film directed by Mauricio Farias. It was shot in Paulínia and Campinas, cities in the state of São Paulo.

Plot
The film follows the reunion of five young adult friends who share the frustration of not having achieved the success they wanted in their lives. The possibility to recover the time they lost arises through a tempting and risky proposal: the assault of a carrier of values. The supposedly perfect crime that promised to transform their trajectories fulfills its purpose, but not exactly as planned.

Cast
 Danton Mello as Rodrigo
 Fábio Porchat as Amaral
 Lúcio Mauro Filho as Danilo
 Natália Lage as Jaqueline
 Gregório Duvivier as Vaguinho
 Bruno Mazzeo as Paulo
 Lúcio Mauro as Seu Altamiro
 Felipe Abib as Tonico
 Roney Facchini as Durval
 Sérgio Guizé

References

External links
 

2013 comedy films
2013 films
Brazilian comedy films
Films shot in Paulínia
Films shot in Campinas
2010s Portuguese-language films